Odugathur is a panchayat town in the Vellore district in the Indian state of Tamil Nadu.

Demographics
, Odugathur had a population of 16,047. Males constitute 49% of the population and females 51%. Odugathur has an average literacy rate of 64%, higher than the national average of 59.5%: male literacy is 73%, and female literacy is 54%. In Odugathur, 11% of the population is under 6 years of age.

References

Cities and towns in Vellore district